In mathematics, the Todd class is a certain construction now considered a part of the theory in algebraic topology of characteristic classes.  The Todd class of a vector bundle can be defined by means of the theory of Chern classes, and is encountered where Chern classes exist — most notably in differential topology, the theory of complex manifolds and algebraic geometry. In rough terms, a Todd class acts like a reciprocal of a Chern class, or stands in relation to it as a conormal bundle does to a normal bundle. 

The Todd class plays a fundamental role in generalising the classical Riemann–Roch theorem to higher dimensions, in the Hirzebruch–Riemann–Roch theorem and the Grothendieck–Hirzebruch–Riemann–Roch theorem.

History 
It is named for J. A. Todd, who introduced a special case of the concept in algebraic geometry in 1937, before the Chern classes were defined. The geometric idea involved is sometimes called the Todd-Eger class. The general definition in higher dimensions is due to Friedrich Hirzebruch.

Definition 
To define the Todd class  where  is a complex vector bundle on a topological space , it is usually possible to limit the definition to the case of a Whitney sum of line bundles, by means of a general device of characteristic class theory, the use of Chern roots (aka, the splitting principle). For the definition, let 

for any . This is symmetric in the s and homogeneous of weight : so can be expressed as a polynomial  in the elementary symmetric functions  of the s.
  

The Todd class can be given explicitly as a formal power series in the Chern classes as follows:

Properties of the Todd class
The Todd class is multiplicative: 

Let  be the fundamental class of the hyperplane section.
From multiplicativity and the Euler exact sequence for the tangent bundle of 
 
one obtains

Computations of the Todd class 
For any algebraic curve  the Todd class is just .

Hirzebruch-Riemann-Roch formula

For any coherent sheaf F on a smooth 
compact complex manifold M, one has

where  is its holomorphic Euler characteristic,

and  its Chern character.

See also
 Genus of a multiplicative sequence

Notes

References

 Friedrich Hirzebruch, Topological methods in algebraic geometry, Springer  (1978)

Characteristic classes